This article lists the birds found in various places in and around the Coimbatore, Tamil Nadu, India. Over 285 species of birds have been recorded in and around Coimbatore.

Acrocephalid warblers
 Blyth's reed warbler (Acrocephalus dumetorum)
 Booted warbler (Iduna caligata)
 Paddyfield warbler (Acrocephalus agricola)
 Sykes's warbler (Iduna rama)

Babblers
 Tawny-bellied babbler (Dumetia hyperythra)
 Yellow-billed babbler (Argya affinis)

Barbets
 Brown-headed barbet, large green barbet (Psilopogon zeylanicus)
 Coppersmith barbet, crimson-breasted barbet, coppersmith (Psilopogon haemacephalus)
 Malabar barbet (Psilopogon malabaricus)
 White-cheeked barbet, small green barbet (Psilopogon viridis)

Bee-eaters
 Blue-bearded bee-eater (Nyctyornis athertoni)
 Blue-tailed bee-eater (Merops philippinus)
 Chestnut-headed bee-eater, bay-headed bee-eater (Merops leschenaulti)
 European bee-eater (Merops apiaster)
 Green bee-eater, little green bee-eater (Merops orientalis)
 Blue-cheeked bee-eater (Merops persicus) first sighting

Bitterns
 Black bittern (Ixobrychus flavicollis)
 Cinnamon bittern, chestnut bittern (Ixobrychus cinnamomeus)
 Yellow bittern (Ixobrychus sinensis)

Bulbuls
 Black bulbul, Himalayan black bulbul, Asian black bulbul, square-tailed bulbul (Hypsipetes leucocephalus)
 Grey-headed bulbul (Brachypodius priocephalus)
 Flame-throated bulbul, ruby-throated bulbul, black-crested bulbul (Rubigula gularis)
 Red-whiskered bulbul (Pycnonotus jocosus)
 Red-vented bulbul (Pycnonotus cafer) 
 White-browed bulbul (Pycnonotus luteolus)
 Yellow-throated bulbul (Pycnonotus xantholaemus)
 Yellow-browed bulbul (Acritillas indica)

Cisticola
 Zitting cisticola, streaked fantail warbler (Cisticola juncidis)
 Common tailorbird (Orthotomus sutorius)

Cormorants
 Great cormorant (Phalacrocorax carbo)
 Indian cormorant, Indian shag (Phalacrocorax fuscicollis)
 Little cormorant (Microcarbo niger)

Coucal
 Southern coucal, crow pheasant (Centropus sinensis)

Coursers
 Indian courser (Cursorius coromandelicus)

Crows
 House crow (Corvus splendens)
 Jungle crow, large-billed crow, thick-billed crow (Corvus macrorhynchos)

Cuckoos
 Asian koel (Eudynamys scolopaceus)
 Banded bay cuckoo, bay-banded cuckoo (Cacomantis sonneratii)
 Brainfever bird, common hawk-cuckoo (Hierococcyx varius)
 Drongo cuckoo, Asian drongo-cuckoo (Surniculus lugubris)
 Grey-bellied cuckoo, the Indian plaintive cuckoo (Cacomantis passerinus)
 Indian cuckoo (Cuculus micropterus)
 Jacobin cuckoo, pied cuckoo, pied crested cuckoo (Clamator jacobinus)

Cuckooshrikes
 Black-headed cuckoo-shrike (Coracina melanoptera) 
 Large cuckoo-shrike (Coracina macei)

Darters
 Darter, snakebird, Oriental darter, Indian darter (Anhinga melanogaster)

Doves and pigeons
 Blue rock pigeon, rock pigeon (Columba livia)
 Emerald dove (Chalcophaps indica)
 Eurasian collared dove, collared dove (Streptopelia decaocto)
 Green imperial pigeon (Ducula aenea)
 Little brown dove, laughing dove, palm dove, Senegal dove (Spilopelia senegalensis)
 Grey-fronted green pigeon (Treron affinis)
 Red collared dove (Streptopelia tranquebarica)
 Spotted dove, Chinese dove, mountain dove, pearl-necked dove, lace-necked dove (Spilopelia chinensis)

Drongos
 Ashy drongo (Dicrurus leucophaeus)
 Black drongo (Dicrurus macrocercus)
 Bronzed drongo (Dicrurus aeneus)
 Greater racket-tailed drongo (Dicrurus paradiseus)
 White-bellied drongo (Dicrurus caerulescens)

Ducks
 Bar-headed goose (Anser indicus)
 Cotton teal, cotton pygmy goose (Nettapus coromandelianus)
 Eurasian teal, common teal (Anas crecca)
 Garganey (Anas querquedula)
 Lesser whistling duck, Indian whistling duck, lesser whistling teal (Dendrocygna javanica)
 Northern shoveler (Anas clypeata)
 Pintail, northern pintail (Anas acuta)
 Ruddy shelduck (Tadorna ferruginea)
 Indian spot-billed duck (Anas poecilorhyncha)

Egrets
 Cattle egret (Bubulcus ibis)
 Great egret, great white egret, common egret, large egret, great white heron (Ardea alba)
 Intermediate egret, median egret, smaller egret, yellow-billed egret (Mesophoyx intermedia)
 Little egret (Egretta garzetta)

Falcons
 Amur falcon, eastern red-footed falcon (Falco amurensis)
 Common kestrel, European kestrel, Eurasian kestrel, Old World kestrel (Falco tinnunculus)
 Eurasian hobby, hobby (Falco subbuteo)
 Red-necked falcon, red-headed merlin (Falco chicquera)

Finches
 Common rosefinch (Carpodacus erythrinus)

Flamingos
 Greater flamingo (Phoenicopterus roseus)

Flowerpeckers
 Nilgiri flowerpecker (Dicaeum concolor)
 Tickell's flowerpecker, pale-billed flowerpecker (Dicaeum erythrorhynchos)

Flycatchers
 Indian paradise flycatcher (Terpsiphone paradisi)
 Asian brown flycatcher (Muscicapa latirostris)
 Black-naped monarch, black-naped blue flycatcher (Hypothymis azurea)
 Brown-breasted flycatcher, Layard's flycatcher (Muscicapa muttui)
 Siberian stonechat, Asian stonechat (Saxicola maurus) 
 Indian robin (Saxicoloides fulicatus) 
 Nilgiri flycatcher (Eumyias albicaudatus)
 Pied bushchat (Saxicola caprata)
 Tickell's blue flycatcher (Cyornis tickelliae)
 Verditer flycatcher (Eumyias thalassinus)

Francolins
 Grey francolin, grey partridge (Francolinus pondicerianus)

Godwit
 Black-tailed godwit (Limosa limosa)

Grebes
 Little grebe (Tachybaptus ruficollis)

Gulls
 Brown-headed gull (Chroicocephalus brunnicephalus)
 Pallas's gull, great black-headed gull (Ichthyaetus ichthyaetus)
 Heuglin's gull, Siberian gull (Larus heuglini)

Hawks, kites and eagles
 Besra (Accipiter virgatus)
 Black eagle (Ictinaetus malaiensis)
 Black kite (Milvus migrans)
 Black-winged kite (Elanus caeruleus)
 Bonelli's eagle (Aquila fasciata)
 Booted eagle (Hieraaetus pennatus)
 Brahminy kite (Haliastur indus)
 Crested goshawk (Accipiter trivirgatus)
 Oriental honey buzzard, crested honey buzzard (Pernis ptilorhynchus)
 Crested serpent eagle (Spilornis cheela)
 Changeable hawk-eagle, crested hawk-eagle (Nisaetus cirrhatus)
 Lesser fish eagle (Ichthyophaga humilis)
 Montagu's harrier (Circus pygargus)
 Osprey, sea hawk, fish eagle, fish hawk (Pandion haliaetus)
 Pallid harrier (Circus macrourus)
 Pied harrier (Circus melanoleucos)
 Rufous-bellied hawk-eagle (Lophotriorchis kienerii)
 Short-toed snake eagle, short-toed eagle (Circaetus gallicus)
 Shikra (Accipiter badius)
 Steppe eagle (Aquila nipalensis)
 Western marsh harrier, Eurasian marsh-harrier (Circus aeruginosus)
 White-bellied sea eagle, white-breasted sea eagle (Haliaeetus leucogaster)
 White-eyed buzzard (Butastur teesa)

Herons
 Black-crowned night heron, night heron (Nycticorax nycticorax)
 Grey heron (Ardea cinerea)
 Indian pond heron, paddybird (Ardeola grayii)
 Purple heron (Ardea purpurea)
 Striated heron, mangrove heron, little heron, green-backed heron (Butorides striata)
 Western reef heron, western reef egret (Egretta gularis)

Hornbills
 Indian grey hornbill (Ocyceros birostris)
 Malabar grey hornbill (Ocyceros griseus)
 Malabar pied hornbill, lesser pied hornbill (Anthracoceros coronatus)
The great Indian hornbill (Buceros
Bicornis)

Ibises
 Black-headed ibis, Oriental white ibis (Threskiornis melanocephalus)
 Glossy ibis (Plegadis falcinellus)
 Black ibis, Indian black ibis, red-naped ibis (Pseudibis papillosa)

Ioras
 Common iora (Aegithina tiphia)

Jacanas
 Bronze-winged jacana (Metopidius indicus)
 Pheasant-tailed jacana (Hydrophasianus chirurgus)

Kingfishers
 Pied kingfisher (Ceryle rudis)
 Common kingfisher, small blue kingfisher, Eurasian kingfisher, river kingfisher (Alcedo Bengalensis)
 Stork-billed kingfisher (Pelargopsis capensis)
 White-throated kingfisher, white-breasted kingfisher, Smyrna kingfisher (Halcyon smyrnensis)

Lapwings
 Red-wattled lapwing (Vanellus indicus)
 Yellow-wattled lapwing (Vanellus malabaricus)

Larks
 Ashy-crowned sparrow lark, ashy-crowned finch-lark, black-bellied finch-lark (Eremopterix griseus)
 Indian bushlark, red-winged bushlark (Mirafra erythroptera)
 Jerdon's bushlark (Mirafra affinis)
 Oriental skylark, Oriental lark, small skylark (Alauda gulgula)
 Rufous-tailed lark, rufous-tailed finch-lark (Ammomanes phoenicura)
 Sykes's lark (Galerida deva)

Laughingthrushes
 Common babbler (Turdoides caudata)
 Jungle babbler (Turdoides striata)
 Large grey babbler (Turdoides malcolmi)
 Yellow-billed babbler, white-headed babbler (Turdoides affinis)

Leafbirds
 Golden-fronted leafbird (Chloropsis aurifrons)
 Jerdon's leafbird (Chloropsis jerdoni)

Malkohas
 Blue-faced malkoha (Phaenicophaeus viridirostris)
 Sirkeer malkoha, sirkeer cuckoo (Phaenicophaeus leschenaultii)

Martins
 Dusky crag martin (Ptyonoprogne concolor)

Minivets
 Scarlet minivet (Pericrocotus flammeus)
 Small minivet (Pericrocotus cinnamomeus)

Nightjars
 Indian nightjar (Caprimulgus asiaticus)

Nuthatches
 Chestnut-bellied nuthatch (Sitta cinnamoventris)
 Velvet-fronted nuthatch (Sitta frontalis)

Old World warblers
 Yellow-eyed babbler (Chrysomma sinense)

Orioles
 Black-headed oriole (Oriolus larvatus)
 Indian golden oriole (Oriolus kundoo)

Owls
 Barn owl, common barn owl (Tyto alba)
 Brown fish owl (Bubo zeylonensis, Ketupa zeylonensis)
 Collared scops owl (Otus lettia)
 Eurasian eagle owl, European eagle-owl, eagle-owl, Indian great horned owl (Bubo bubo)
 Jungle owlet, barred jungle owlet (Glaucidium radiatum)
 Mottled wood owl (Strix ocellata)
 Short-eared owl (Asio flammeus)
 Spotted owlet (Athene brama)

Parrots and parakeets
 Blue-winged parakeet, Malabar parakeet (Psittacula columboides)
 Plum-headed parakeet (Psittacula cyanocephala)
 Rose-ringed parakeet, ring-necked parakeet (Psittacula krameri)
 Vernal hanging parrot (Loriculus vernalis)

Pelicans
 Great white pelican, eastern white pelican, rosy pelican, white pelican (Pelecanus onocrotalus)
 Spot-billed pelican, grey pelican (Pelecanus philippensis)

Phalarope
 Red-necked phalarope (Phalaropus lobatus)

Phylloscopid warblers
 Greenish warbler (Phylloscopus trochiloides)

Pipits
 Paddyfield pipit, Oriental pipit (Anthus rufulus)
 Richard's pipit (Anthus richardi)

Pitta
 Indian pitta (Pitta brachyura)

Plovers
 Kentish plover (Charadrius alexandrinus)
 Little ringed plover (Charadrius dubius)
 Lesser sand plover (Charadrius mongolus)

Pranticoles
 Collared pratincole, common pratincole (Glareola pratincola)
 Small pratincole, little pratincole, small Indian pratincole (Glareola lactea)

Prinias
 Ashy prinia, ashy wren-warbler (Prinia socialis)
 Grey-breasted prinia (Prinia hodgsonii)
 Jungle prinia (Prinia sylvatica)
 Plain prinia, white-browed, wren-warbler (Prinia inornata)

Quails
 Common quail (Coturnix coturnix)
 Common buttonquail, Kurrichane buttonquail, small buttonquail, Andalusian hemipode (Turnix sylvaticus)
 Jungle bush quail (Perdicula asiatica)
 Painted bush quail (Perdicula erythrorhyncha)

Rails, crakes and coots

 Baillon's crake (Porzana pusilla)
 Common coot, Eurasian coot, coot (Fulica atra)
 Common moorhen (Gallinula chloropus)
 Little crake (Porzana parva)
 Purple moorhen, purple swamphen, purple gallinule, purple coot (Porphyrio porphyrio)
 Ruddy-breasted crake, ruddy crake (Porzana fusca)
 Water cock (Gallicrex cinerea)
 White-breasted waterhen (Amaurornis phoenicurus)

Robin
 Indian robin (Saxicoloides fulicatus)
 Oriental magpie robin (Copsychus saularis)

Rollers and hoopoe
 Cinnamon roller, broad-billed roller (Eurystomus glaucurus)
 Hoopoe (Upupa epops)
 Indian roller, blue jay (Coracias benghalensis)

Sandgrouses
 Chestnut-bellied sandgrouse (Pterocles exustus)
 Painted sandgrouse, ganga indien (Pterocles indicus)

Sandpipers
 Common sandpiper (Actitis hypoleucos)
 Green sandpiper (Tringa ochropus) 
 Marsh sandpiper (Tringa stagnatilis)
 Wood sandpiper (Tringa glareola)

Shank
 Common greenshank (Tringa nebularia)
 Common redshank, redshank (Tringa totanus)

Shrikes
 Bar-winged flycatcher-shrike (Hemipus picatus) 
 Bay-backed shrike (Lanius vittatus) 
 Brown shrike (Lanius cristatus) 
 Common woodshrike (Tephrodornis pondicerianus)
 Long-tailed shrike, rufous-backed shrike (Lanius schach)

Snipes
 Common snipe (Gallinago gallinago)
 Greater painted-snipe (Rostratula benghalensis)

Sparrows
 House sparrow (Passer domesticus)
 Yellow-throated sparrow, chestnut-shouldered petronia (Gymnoris xanthocollis)

Spoonbills
 Eurasian spoonbill, common spoonbill (Platalea leucorodia)

Spurfowls
 Grey junglefowl, Sonnerat's junglefowl (Gallus sonneratii)
 Indian peafowl, blue peafowl (Pavo cristatus)
 Red spurfowl (Galloperdix spadicea)

Stilts
 Black-winged stilt, common stilt, pied stilt (Himantopus himantopus)

Stints
 Little stint (Calidris minuta, Erolia minuta)
 Temminck's stint (Calidris temminckii)

Starlings
 Brahminy starling, brahminy myna (Sturnia pagodarum)
 Chestnut-tailed starling, grey-headed myna (Sturnia malabarica)
 Common myna, Indian myna, mynah (Acridotheres tristis)
 Jungle myna (Acridotheres fuscus)
 Rosy starling, rose-coloured starling, rose-coloured pastor (Pastor roseus)

Storks
 Asian openbill, Asian open-billed stork (Anastomus oscitans)
 Painted stork (Mycteria leucocephala)
 Woolly-necked stork, bishop stork, white-necked stork, episcopos (Ciconia episcopus)

Sunbirds and spiderhunters
 Little spiderhunter (Arachnothera longirostra)
 Loten's sunbird, long-billed sunbird, maroon-breasted sunbird (Cinnyris lotenius)
 Purple-rumped sunbird (Leptocoma zeylonica)
 Purple sunbird (Cinnyris asiaticus)
 Crimson-backed sunbird, small sunbird (Leptocoma minima)

Swallows
 Ashy woodswallow, ashy swallow-shrike (Artamus fuscus)
 Barn swallow (Hirundo rustica)
 Wire-tailed swallow (Hirundo smithii)
 Red-rumped swallow (Cecropis daurica)
 Streak-throated swallow, Indian cliff swallow (Petrochelidon fluvicola)

Swifts
 Asian palm swift (Cypsiurus balasiensis)
 Crested treeswift (Hemiprocne coronata)
 House swift (Apus nipalensis)

Terns
 Common tern (Sterna hirundo)
 Gull-billed tern (Gelochelidon nilotica)
 River tern, Indian river tern (Sterna aurantia)
 Whiskered tern (Chlidonias hybrida)

Thrushes and allies
 Indian blackbird, blackbird, Eurasian blackbird (Turdus nigropileus [WG] or T. spencei [EG] or T. simillimus)
 Malabar whistling thrush, whistling schoolboy (Myophonus horsfieldii)
 Orange-headed thrush (Geokichla citrina)
 Scaly thrush (Zoothera dauma)
 Nilgiri blue robin, Nilgiri shortwing, white-bellied shortwing, rufous-bellied shortwing (Myiomela major)

Treepies
 Rufous treepie, Indian treepie (Dendrocitta vagabunda)
 White-bellied treepie (Dendrocitta leucogastra)

Trogons
 Malabar trogon (Harpactes fasciatus)

Tit
 Cinereous tit, great tit (Parus cinereus)
 Indian yellow tit (Parus aplonotus)

Wagtails and pipits
 Forest wagtail (Dendronanthus indicus)
 Grey wagtail (Motacilla cinerea)
 Large pied wagtail, large pied wagtail (Motacilla maderaspatensis)
 White wagtail (Motacilla alba)

Waxbills and allies
 Tricoloured munia (Lonchura malacca)
 Black-throated munia, Jerdon's mannikin (Lonchura jerdoni or kelaarti)
 Red munia, red munia, strawberry finch (Amandava amandava)
 Scaly-breasted munia, spotted munia (Lonchura punctulata)
 White-rumped munia, white-rumped mannikin, Striated finch (Lonchura striata)
 Indian silverbill, white-throated munia (Euodice malabarica)

Weavers
 Baya weaver (Ploceus philippinus)

White-eye
 Indian white-eye (Zosterops palpebrosus)

Woodpeckers
 Brown-capped pygmy woodpecker (Dendrocopos nanus)
 Golden-backed woodpecker, lesser golden-backed woodpecker, lesser goldenback (Dinopium

benghalense)
 Greater flameback, greater goldenback, large golden-backed woodpecker, Malherbe's golden-backed woodpecker (Chrysocolaptes guttacristatus)
 Lesser golden-backed woodpecker, lesser goldenback (Dinopium benghalense)
 Lesser yellownape (Picus chlorolophus)
 Rufous woodpecker (Micropternus brachyurus)
 Speckled piculet (Picumnus innominatus)
 Streak-throated woodpecker (Picus xanthopygaeus)
 Yellow-crowned woodpecker, Mahratta woodpecker (Dendrocopos mahrattensis)

See also
 List of birds of Tamil Nadu 
 List of birds of South India 
 List of birds of India

References

 Birds of Singanallur lake 
 List of birds observed in the Coimbatore forest division

Coimbatore
Coimbatore-related lists
Coimbatore